James E. Davis (April 3, 1962 – July 23, 2003) was a New York City policeman, corrections officer and council member. He was murdered in New York City Hall by a disgruntled aspiring opponent.

Early life
Davis was born and raised in Brooklyn, the son of a corrections officer and a registered nurse. He was raised with his brother Geoffrey A. Davis. He spent his early childhood in Bedford-Stuyvesant before his family moved to Crown Heights.

He earned a bachelor's degree at Pace University in social science and youth agency administration. He became a corrections officer at Rikers Island after being beaten by two white police officers, and then became a police officer himself in 1991. In 1990, Davis had started an organization called "Love Yourself Stop the Violence" dedicated to stopping violence in urban America. The NYPD soon assigned Davis to the New York City Police Academy as an instructor, and he became a frequent guest on local radio and television programs.

Political career

Davis eventually qualified as a minister at Holy Trinity Baptist Church of Brooklyn  and became a district leader and then a council member for Brooklyn's 35th Council district in November 2001.

The template for his successful City Council bid had been established by previous races against Assemblyman and Democratic Kings County Chairman Clarence Norman Jr., who narrowly defeated him in 1998. The campaign against the politically powerful Norman—and Davis's high profile generally—ruffled feathers within the NYPD, and Davis was fired for violating a rule that prohibits paid city employees from engaging in electoral politics. In that November's election, his name was on the ballot on the old Liberal Party of New York line, for which Davis was fired from the NYPD.  After pursuing litigation against the police department, Davis's claim that he never formally accepted the Liberal Party nomination was upheld and he was allowed to reclaim his job. He was not, however, permitted to return to his former detail at the police academy, instead being assigned to a night shift at a Brooklyn precinct.

His next campaign in 2001 was successful but would later be a factor in Davis's murder. Othniel Askew had raised funds to run against him, but had failed to file the proper papers on time, which led to accusations of political chicanery and caused Askew to harbor a grudge against Davis.

Death

On July 23, 2003, Davis brought Askew to attend a council meeting at the council chambers in New York City Hall, with the intention of honoring him by introducing him from the balcony. The councilman and Askew were able to bypass the metal detectors, a courtesy offered to elected officials and their guests. Once in the balcony, and as the full council and dozens of attendees gathered into the chamber for the meeting, at 2:08 p.m., Askew fired a silver .40 caliber weapon at Davis, striking him several times in the torso. Davis, a retired police officer, was carrying a weapon, but it remained holstered. A plainclothes policeman, Richard Burt, on duty as bodyguard to Gifford Miller, Speaker of the City Council, then fired at Askew from the floor of the chamber, striking Askew five times. Paramedics arrived quickly, and attempted to revive both Davis and Askew before taking them to Beekman Downtown Hospital, where both men died. Askew had a history of violence. It was discovered after the murder that Askew had asked Davis to sign papers naming him as Davis's replacement in case anything happened to Davis.

Davis's brother Geoffrey announced that he would run for the seat formerly held by his brother. He was defeated by fellow Democrat Letitia James, running on the Working Families Party line.

Davis was buried in Green-Wood Cemetery in Brooklyn. Upon learning his killer's ashes were also in Green-Wood, Davis's family had his body exhumed and reinterred in the Cemetery of the Evergreens.

Law & Order episode
The murder incident would be used as the basis for "City Hall", an episode of Law & Order which aired on February 11, 2004. However, in the adaptation, the dead councilman was an innocent bystander, with the second victim, a low-level bureaucrat who survived with a shoulder wound, as the true target.

Electoral history

See also
List of assassinated American politicians

References

External links
Biography at "Love Yourself" Stop the Violence
The Plot Thickens

1962 births
2003 deaths
20th-century American politicians
21st-century American politicians
Burials at Green-Wood Cemetery
Burials at the Cemetery of the Evergreens
New York City Council members
New York City Police Department officers
New York (state) Democrats
African-American New York City Council members
African-American police officers
American prison officers
Assassinated American politicians
Deaths by firearm in Manhattan
Pace University alumni
People from Bedford–Stuyvesant, Brooklyn
People from Crown Heights, Brooklyn
People murdered in New York City
Male murder victims
Politicians from Brooklyn
20th-century African-American politicians
African-American men in politics
21st-century African-American politicians
Assassinated American county and local politicians